The 1968 Iowa State Senate elections took place as part of the biennial 1968 United States elections. Iowa voters elected state senators in 33 of the state senate's 61 districts. At this time, the Iowa Senate still had several multi-member districts. State senators serve four-year terms in the Iowa State Senate.

A statewide map of the 61 state Senate districts in the year 1968 is provided by the Iowa General Assembly here.

The primary election on September 3, 1968 determined which candidates appeared on the November 5, 1968 general election ballot. Primary election results can be obtained here. General election results can be obtained here.

Following the previous election, Democrats had control of the Iowa state Senate with 32 seats to Republicans' 29 seats.

To claim control of the chamber from Democrats, the Republicans needed to net 2 Senate seats.

Republicans flipped control of the Iowa State Senate following the 1968 general election with the balance of power shifting to Republicans holding 45 seats and Democrats having 16 seats (a net gain of 16 seats for Republicans).

Summary of Results
Note: The 28 holdover Senators not up for re-election are listed here with asterisks (*). A list of these holdover state senators is provided here.

Source:

Detailed Results
33 of the 61 Iowa Senate seats were up for election in 1968.

Note: If a district does not list a primary, then that district did not have a competitive primary (i.e., there may have only been one candidate file for that district).

District 2

District 3

District 4

District 5

District 10

District 11

District 12

District 13
The 13th was a 2-member district in 1968. The first subdistrict had a holdover Senator.

District 15
The 15th was a 2-member district in 1968. Both subdistricts held elections.

District 17

District 20
The 20th was a 5-member district in 1968. Subdistricts Nos. 2, 3, & 5 had holdover Senators. Subdistricts Nos. 1 & 4 held elections.

District 21

District 24
The 24th was a 3-member district in 1968. Subdistrict No. 2 had a holdover Senator. Subdistricts Nos. 1 & 3 held elections.

District 26

District 28

District 31

District 32
The 32nd was a 3-member district in 1968. Subdistricts Nos. 1 & 2 had holdover Senators. Subdistrict No. 3 held an election.

District 35

District 37
The 37th was a 2-member district in 1968. Subdistrict No. 2 had a holdover Senator. Subdistrict No. 1 held an election.

District 38

District 39

District 41

District 42

District 43

District 44

District 45

District 46

District 47

District 48

District 49

See also
 United States elections, 1968
 United States House of Representatives elections in Iowa, 1968
 Elections in Iowa

References

1968 Iowa elections
Iowa Senate elections
Iowa State Senate